The city of Jacksonville, Florida and the Jacksonville metropolitan area host numerous events year-round. This listing includes the most notable of those events.

Annual events
Most events are coordinated through the City of Jacksonville, department of Recreation and Community Services.

January
Gator Bowl

February
Mardi Gras Jax

March
Amelia Island Concours d'Elegance 
Gate River Run 
Great Atlantic Seafood & Music Festival

April
Blessing of the Fleet 
Jacksonville Jazz Festival 
Mandarin Art Festival
One Spark
Springing the Blues 
Starry Nights Concerts at Metropolitan Park 
Tree Hill Nature Center Butterfly Festival
 "Things We Don't Talk About - Women's Stories of the Red Tent" - Jacksonville premier
Rockville

May
Isle of Eight Flags Shrimp Festival
Jacksonville Film Festival 
Mug Race
Memorial Day at the Veterans Memorial Wall 
The Players Championship 
World of Nations Celebration

July
Freedom, Fanfare & Fireworks 
Greater Jacksonville Kingfish Tournament
Jacksonville Beach 4th of July Fireworks

October
Florida vs. Georgia Football Classic 
Jacksonville Pride
Jacksonville Sea & Sky Spectacular

November
Greater Jacksonville Agricultural Fair (Jacksonville Fair) 
Jacksonville Light Parade
Northeast Florida Veg Fest
Planetfest

Churches
Basilica of the Immaculate Conception
Bethel Baptist Institutional Church
Cathedral Basilica of St. Augustine
First Church of Christ, Scientist
Mount Zion AME Church
Riverside Baptist Church 
St. Andrews Episcopal Church
St. John's Cathedral

Event facilities

City owned
The city contracts with a company to manage and operate:  
Baseball Grounds of Jacksonville
Jacksonville Municipal Stadium
VyStar Veterans Memorial Arena
Prime F. Osborn III Convention Center
Ritz Theatre (Jacksonville)
Times-Union Center for the Performing Arts
 Jacoby Symphony Hall - home of Jacksonville Symphony Orchestra
 Jim & Jan Moran Theater - featuring touring Broadway theatre

Each entity that rents the venue is responsible for the event's operations:
Daily's Place Amphitheater
Metropolitan Park
Cecil Recreation Complex 
Jacksonville Equestrian Center
Jacksonville Aquatics Center

Privately owned
Adventure Landing
Alhambra Dinner Theatre
Catty Shack Ranch Wildlife Sanctuary
Dave & Buster's
Florida Theatre
Hyatt Regency Jacksonville Riverfront
Jacksonville Fairgrounds & Exposition Center
Jacksonville Landing
Latitude 30
Morocco Shrine Auditorium
Riverside Theater
Shipwreck Island
St. Augustine Amphitheatre
Theatre Jacksonville

Historic homes
Epping Forest
Henry John Klutho House
Lane-Towers House
Napoleon Bonaparte Broward House

Museums
Alexander Brest Museum and Gallery
Alexander Brest Planetarium
Amelia Island Museum of History
The Beaches Museum & History Center
Black Heritage Museum
Camp Blanding Museum and Memorial Park
Castillo de San Marcos
Jacksonville Fire Museum
Clay County Historical Society Museum
Cummer Museum of Art and Gardens
Fort Caroline National Memorial
Fort Clinch State Park
Jacksonville Maritime Museum
Jacksonville University Life Sciences Museum
Karpeles Manuscript Museum
Kingsley Plantation
LaVilla Museum
Mandarin Museum
Merrill House Museum
Middleburg Historical Museum
Museum of Contemporary Art Jacksonville
Museum of Science & History
Museum of Southern History
Nathan H. Wilson Center for the Arts
Old Morocco Temple Building
Old Jail Museum
Oldest Wooden Schoolhouse
Olustee Battlefield Historic State Park
Potter's Wax Museum
Ripley's Believe It or Not Museum
St. Augustine Lighthouse & Museum
St. Photios Greek Orthodox National Shrine
Spanish Military Hospital Museum
University Gallery at University of North Florida
Villa Zorayda
World Golf Hall of Fame

Outdoor attractions
The Atlantic Ocean at
Atlantic Beach, Florida
Jacksonville Beach, Florida
Neptune Beach, Florida
Ponte Vedra Beach, Florida
Jacksonville Arboretum & Gardens
Jacksonville Riverwalk
Friendship Fountain
Jacksonville Zoo and Gardens
Palm and Cycad Arboretum
St. Augustine Alligator Farm Zoological Park
St. Augustine Lighthouse
Treaty Oak
Tree Hill Nature Center

Parks

Jacksonville operates the largest urban park system in the United States, providing facilities and services at more than 337 locations on more than  located throughout the city. Several are located on the St. Johns River or have beaches on the Atlantic Ocean, such as Hanna Park. In addition to municipal parks, there are ten state parks and five national facilities in the area. Jacksonville is home to the world's oldest continually-operated skatepark, Kona Skatepark.

State
Amelia Island State Park
Anastasia State Park
Big Talbot Island State Park
Fort Clinch State Park
Fort George Island Cultural State Park
George Crady Bridge Fishing Pier State Park
Little Talbot Island State Park
Olustee Battlefield Historic State Park
Pumpkin Hill Creek Preserve State Park
Yellow Bluff Fort Historic State Park

National
Castillo de San Marcos National Monument
Fort Caroline National Memorial
Fort Matanzas National Monument
Jacksonville National Cemetery
Kingsley Plantation

Shopping venues
Avenues Mall
Jacksonville Landing
Regency Square Mall
River City Marketplace
St. Augustine Outlet Mall
St. Johns Town Center

Sports facilities

Baseball
Alexander Brest Field - home of the Jacksonville Dolphins 
Baseball Grounds of Jacksonville - home of the Jacksonville Jumbo Shrimp
Harmon Stadium - home of the North Florida Ospreys

Basketball
VyStar Veterans Memorial Arena - home of the Jacksonville Giants
Swisher Gymnasium - home of the Jacksonville Dolphins
UNF Arena - home of the North Florida Ospreys

Football
Bolles School Stadium - home of the Jacksonville Dixie Blues 
D. B. Milne Field - home of the Jacksonville Dolphins
EverBank Field - home of the Jacksonville Jaguars
Hodges Stadium - home of the North Florida Ospreys and Jacksonville Axemen
VyStar Veterans Memorial Arena - home of the Jacksonville Sharks

Golf
The Greater Jacksonville Metropolitan Area boasts 64 golf courses, of which 18 are public, 18 are semi-private, 15 are private and 13 are resort courses. All are within a one-hour drive of downtown Jacksonville.

Soccer and rugby
Hodges Stadium - home of the North Florida Ospreys and Jacksonville Axemen

Other
Cecil Recreation Complex
Cecil Aquatics center
Cecil Equestrian center
Cecil Fastpitch Softball
Jacksonville Ice - home of the Jacksonville RollerGirls

References

 
Jacksonville
Tourist attractions in Jacksonville, Florida
Jacksonville, Florida-related lists